Island of the Sea Wolves is a 2022 British documentary series narrated by Will Arnett. Filmed on Vancouver Island, the series focuses on sea wolves and bald eagles, animal species that must forage for food in the cold waters of the Pacific Ocean. The series premiered on the Netflix streaming platform on October 11, 2022.

Episodes

Reception 
The documentary was well received by critics. Joel Keller of Decider said that the series "does what a lot of nature docuseries should do, which is focus on one geographical area and follow its inhabitants through the different seasons. It makes for a fascinating show".

Greg Wheeler of The Review Geek wrote: "Island of the Sea Wolves is an informative, well-written and enjoyable nature docu-series. Sure, it’s no David Attenborough epic but while Frozen Planet II awes and inspires on BBC, Netflix’s effort isn’t bad either". Jordan Russell Lyon of the site Ready Steady Cut called it a good offering for fans of nature shows.

References

External links 

 

2022 British television series debuts
2020s British documentary television series
Documentary films about nature